Islamic Democratic Party can refer to:
 Islamic Democratic Party (Maldives)
 Islamic Democratic Party (Rwanda)
  Various Islamic democratic political parties that go by different names